The 2000 Tour de Langkawi was the 5th edition of the Tour de Langkawi, a cycling stage race that took place in Malaysia. It began with a prologue criterium on 25 January in Langkawi and ended on 6 February in Kuala Lumpur. In fact, this race was rated by the Union Cycliste Internationale (UCI) as a 2.4 category race.

Chris Horner of USA won the race, followed by Julio Alberto Pérez of Mexico second and Fortunato Baliani of Italy third. Gordon Fraser won the points classification category and Julio Alberto Pérez won the mountains classification category. Mercury won the team classification category.

Stages
The cyclists competed in 12 stages, covering a distance of 1,604.9 kilometres. Prologue did not count towards the overall but many riders competed in the stage.

Classification leadership

Final standings

General classification

Points classification

Mountains classification

Asian rider classification

Team classification

Asian team classification

List of teams and riders
A total of 25 teams were invited to participate in the 2000 Tour de Langkawi. Out of the 149 riders, a total of 126 riders made it to the finish in Kuala Lumpur.

 Sergei Ivanov
 Dave Bruylandts
 Jans Koerts
 Michel Lafis
 Glenn Magnusson
 Koos Moerenhout

 Guido Trenti
 Marco Di Renzo
 Federico Giabbecucci
 Emanuele Negrini
 Germano Pierdomenico

 Daniele Contrini
 Fabio Marchesin
 Christian Morini
 Giancarlo Raimondi
 Ellis Rastelli
 Gorazd Štangelj

 Julio Alberto Pérez
 Luca Cei
 Enrico Degano
 Nathan O'Neill
 Tom Leaper
 Vladimir Duma

 Thierry Gouvenou
 Alexei Sivakov
 Lylian Lebreton
 Oleg Joukov
 Loic Lamouller
 Denis Leproux

 Matthias Buxhofer
 Dominique Perras
 Alexandre Usov
 René Stadelmann
 Jochen Summer
 Jérôme Delbove

 Jacek Mickiewicz
 Piotr Chmielewski
 Grzegorz Wajs
 Dariusz Wojciechowski
 Arkadiusz Wojtas
 Sebastian Wolski

Saturn
 Frank McCormack
 Antonio Cruz
 Mark McCormack
 Chris Wherry
 Michael Barry
 Trent Klasna
Linda McCartney Cycling Team
 Benjamin Brooks
 David McKenzie
 Bjørnar Vestøl
 Matthew Stephens
 Ciarán Power
 Spencer Smith
Telekom Malaysia All-Stars
 Graeme Miller
 Glen Mitchell
 Wong Kam-po
 Nor Effandy Rosli
 John Talen
 Franky Van Haesebroucke

 Evgeni Berzin
 Ivan Quaranta
 Corrado Serina
 Alberto Ongarato
 Graziano Recinella
 Serguei Lelekin

 Frédéric Gabriel
 Pascal Deramé
 Christophe Faudot
 Damien Nazon
 Mickaël Pichon
 Walter Bénéteau

 Torsten Schmidt
 Sven Teutenberg
 Peter Wrolich
 Volker Ordowski
 Uwe Peschel
 René Haselbacher

Mercury
 Henk Vogels
 Jan Bratkowski
 Gordon Fraser
 Chris Horner
 Floyd Landis
 Steve Zampeiri

 Danny Baeyens
 Tony Bracke
 Eric De Clercq
 Dirk Aernouts
 Koen Deschuytter
 Oleg Pankov

 Chepe González
 Fortunato Baliani
 Gianluca Tonetti
 Andrea Paluan
 Andris Naudužs
 Jamie Drew
Malaysia
 Sharulneeza Razali
 Tsen Seong Hoong
 Wong Ah Thiam
 Musairi Musa
 Mohd Mahazir Hamad
 Mohd Suhaimi Keton
South Africa
 Daniel Spence
 Tiaan Kannemeyer
 Ryan Cox
 Simon Kessler
 Kosie Loubser
 Douglas Ryder
Indonesia
 Sulistiono Sulistiono
 Wawan Setyobudi
 Hengky Setiawan
 Agung Joni Suryo
 Suyitno Suyitno
 Herry Janto Setiawan

China
 Li Fuyu
 Feng Luanyun
 Li Fuji
 Wong Guozhang
 Xiao Yechen
 Zhu Yongbiao
Denmark
 Lennie Kristensen
 Morten Sonne
 Martin Kryger
 Jan Jespersen
 Dennis Rasmussen
 Stig Dam
Japan
 Makoto Iijima
 Yasutaka Tashiro
 Hidenori Nodera
 Hideto Yukinari
 Yoshimasa Hirose
 Yasuhiro Yamamoto
Philippines
 Victor Espiritu
 Warren Davadilla
 Arnel Quirimit
 Enrique Domingo
 Villamor Baluyut
 Merculio Ramos
Canada
 Eric Wohlberg
 Mark Walters
 Paul Kelly
 Mat Anand
 Sylvain Beauchamp
 Peter Wedge
Nürnberger
 Artour Babaitsev
 Christoph Goehring
 Alexander Kastenhuber
 Roland Mueller
 Heinrich Trumheller
 Jürgen Werner

References

2000
2000 in road cycling
2000 in Malaysian sport